Gymnopilus praefloccosus is a species of mushroom in the family Hymenogastraceae.

Description

Habitat and distribution
Gymnopilus praefloccosus grows on decayed sweetgum logs. It has been found in Florida, in May.

See also

List of Gymnopilus species

References

External links
Gymnopilus praefloccosus at Index Fungorum

praefloccosus
Fungi of North America
Taxa named by William Alphonso Murrill